Ticket Dabang (티켓 다방) is a variant of a dabang, where the delivery woman travels directly to the client and then provides a sexual service upon arrival.

References

See also
Ticket (1985 film)
You Are My Sunshine (2005 film)
Call girl
Prostitution in South Korea

Prostitution in South Korea
Sex industry in Asia